Dylan Littlehales (born 2 November 1999) is an Australian paracanoeist. He competed for Australia at the 2016 Rio Paralympics and 2020 Tokyo Paralympics.

Personal

Littlehales was born on 2 November 1999. At birth, his right leg had a deficiency with it missing some crucial ligaments and bones. He has undergone 20 operations to improve the overcome but still has poor mobility and strength in the right leg. He attended Kariong Mountains High School. In 2021, He is undertaking a Bachelor of Science majoring in Psychology at the University of Newcastle. He lives in Kariong, New South Wales.

Canoeing
He is classified as KL3 paracanoeist. His uncle Mike Druce, Australian slalom coach, introduced him to paracanoeing at the age of fourteen. He said: "I picked up the sport at the perfect time, because right after I started a new canoe club started about 20 minutes away from me. They had a bunch of boats and paddles, and then I got my own stuff eventually. It is difficult to be able to stay in the boat at first, just to sit fine in it can be a pretty physical thing. After learning that, it is more of a mental thing and building up physical strength."

At the 2015 Australian Championships in Sydney, he finished second in the Men's K1 200 LTA and third in the Men's K1 500 and 1000 LTA events. As a fifteen year old, he competed at the 2015 ICF Canoe Sprint World Championships, Milan. He was the youngest competitor by three years. He finished eight in the  Men's KL3 200m B Final.

In 2016, he was the gold medallist at the Australian Championships in Perth, Western Australia and Oceania Championships in the Men's 200 m KL3. At the 2016 ICF Paracanoe World Championships in Duisburg, Germany, he finished second in the Men's 200 m KL3 B Final. This qualified Australia a 2016 Rio Paralympics quota spot. At the Rio Paralympics, at the age of seventeen, he finished sixth in the Men's KL3 semi-final and did not qualify for the final.

In November 2016, he was awarded Australian Canoeing Junior Canoeist of the Year.

At the 2017 ICF Canoe Sprint World Championships, Račice, Czech Republic, he finished fifth in the Men's KL3 200m.  At the 2018 ICF Canoe Sprint World Championships, Montemor-o-Velho, Portugal, he again finished fifth in the Men's KL3 200m.

At the 2019 ICF Canoe Sprint World Championships, Szeged, Hungary, he finished fourth in the Men's KL3 200m.

At the 2020 Summer Paralympics, Littlehales finished fourth in the Men's Men's KL3 200m. He came second in his Heat and won his Semi-Final. He could not better his Semi-Final time of 40.234. If he had he would have won the Gold medal.

Littlehales won his first international medal by winning the bronze medal in the Men's KL3 200m at the 2022 ICF Canoe Sprint World Championships.

Littlehales is coached by Paul Hutchinson, David Birt and Shaun Caven and is a member of the Avoca Kayak Club. He models his kayaking technique on two Australian kayakers -  Lachlan Tame and Rob McIntyre.

He also swims for the Gosford Stingrays Swim Club.

Recognition
2015 - Central Coast Young Achiever.
2017 - Australian Canoeing Junior Canoeist of the Year - Olympic/Paralympic

References

External links

Australian Canoeing Profile

1999 births
Living people
Paracanoeists of Australia
Paracanoeists at the 2016 Summer Paralympics
Paracanoeists at the 2020 Summer Paralympics
ICF Canoe Sprint World Championships medalists in paracanoe